Guale was a historic Native American chiefdom of Mississippian culture peoples located along the coast of present-day Georgia and the Sea Islands. Spanish Florida established its Roman Catholic missionary system in the chiefdom in the late 16th century.

During the late 17th century and early 18th century, Guale society was shattered by extensive epidemics of new infectious diseases and attacks by other tribes. Some of the surviving remnants migrated to the mission areas of Spanish Florida, while others remained near the Georgia coast. Joining with other survivors, they became known as the Yamasee, an ethnically mixed group that emerged in a process of ethnogenesis.

Language

Scholars have not reached a consensus on how to classify the Guale language. Early claims that the Guale spoke a Muskogean language were questioned by the historian William C. Sturtevant. He has shown that recorded vocabulary, which sources had believed to be Guale, was Creek, a distinct Muskogean language.

Historical references note that the Jesuit Brother Domingo Agustín Váez recorded Guale grammar in 1569, but the documents have not been found. The Guale are believed to have been a Mississippian culture group that had a chiefdom along what is now the Georgia coast in the early period of Spanish exploration.

History

Prehistory
Archaeological studies indicate that the precursors of the historically known Guale lived along the Georgia coast and Sea Islands, from at least 1150 AD. Archaeologists identify the prehistoric Guale cultures as the Savannah phase (1150 to 1300 AD) and the Irene phase (1300 to circa 1600). While the prehistoric ancestors to the Guale shared many characteristics with regional neighbors, they left unique archaeological features that distinguished the "proto-Guale" people from other groups.

The prehistoric people were organized into chiefdoms. They built Mississippian-type platform mounds, major earthworks requiring the organized labor of many people, and using highly skilled soil and engineering knowledge. They used the mounds for ceremonial, religious and burial purposes.

European contact

French explorers under Jean Ribault contacted the Guale, whom they called the Oade after their chief, during their voyage to the Atlantic coast of North America in 1562. The Guale maintained good relations with the ephemeral French settlement known as Charlesfort on Parris Island in what is now South Carolina.

When the Spanish later established themselves in St. Augustine in Spanish Florida, they also contacted the Guale. They soon tried to bring them into their mission system. The Guale territory became one of the four primary mission provinces of Spanish Florida; the Timucua, Mocama, and Apalachee Provinces, also named after the resident tribes of the territories, were the others.

The boundaries of the Spanish Guale Province corresponded to the people's territory along the Atlantic coast and Sea Islands, north of the Altamaha River and south of the Savannah River. It included Ossabaw, St. Catherine's, Sapelo, Tybee, and Wassaw islands, among others. By the mid-17th century, the Spanish had established six Catholic missions in Guale territory, including Nuestra Señora de Guadalupe de Tolomato and Santa Catalina de Guale. Their largest settlements were probably on St. Catherine's Island.

Guale was the least stable of the four major mission provinces. The first Guale rebellion, often labeled Juanillo's Revolt, began on October 4, 1597. The Guale rebelled again 1645, nearly shaking off the missions. They kept up a clandestine trade with French privateers, which provided them with alternate sources of goods.

Effect on health 
After the arrival of Europeans and their intervention in Guale villages, the Guale increased their consumption of corn. Bioarcheaologists tested the levels of C4 molecules in the natives' bones to determine the corn intake levels. By comparison, their intake of other foods such as fish, animals, other plants, etc. decreased. These changes were not for the better, as a corn-dominated diet is poor for overall health.  

The Guale Indians were forced to work under the Europeans in ways they never had had to before. It was labor-intensive. Spencer Larsen and Christopher Ruff concluded this based on their analysis of the second moments of area on humerus and femur bones. This is an engineering approach used to show the strength of the bone. They found that there was an increased strength of the bones due to higher repetitive usage, supporting the original statement.

La Tama and Yamasee amalgamation
Indians throughout the American southeast were drawn to the Spanish mission provinces for their trade in European manufactured goods. Various non-Guale Indians settled in or near the Guale missions during the 17th century. Most were from an Indian province of north-central Georgia called La Tama by the Spanish. In the 1660s the well-armed Westo attacked La Tama and neighboring regions, dispersing the La Tama in several directions. Some migrated to the lower Chattahoochee River towns of Coweta and Cussita, the Apalachee mission provinces, and the Guale province. The La Tama spoke a dialect of Hitchiti, a Muskogean language, as did several towns in Apalachicola Province. The Guale language may or may not have been related.

In 1675 the Spanish first used the term Yamasee to refer to the newcomer refugees. They thought them similar to the La Tama. In Guale Province, some of the Yamasee joined the existing missions, while others settled on the periphery.

Destruction and dispersal

Between 1675 and 1684, the Westo tribe, supported by English colonists in the colonies of Carolina and Virginia, destroyed all Spanish missions in Georgia. Attacks by English-supported pirates also contributed to the breakup of the missions. In 1680 a group of pirates sacked Mission Santa Catalina de Guale. By 1684 the Spanish and Indians had abandoned all six missions.

The La Tama Yamasee, Guale, and other refugees scattered in the southeast. Some relocated to new missions in Spanish Florida, but most rejected Spanish authority. They felt Spain had been unable to protect them and resented their failure to provide firearms. The Indians of Guale Province moved mostly to the Apalachee or Apalachicola regions.

Emergence of the Yamasee
Around or before 1684, one small group of Yamasee-Guale refugees, led by Chief Altamaha, moved north to the mouth of the Savannah River. That year, a Scottish colony called Stuarts Town was founded in South Carolina on Port Royal Sound near the Savannah River. Stuarts Town survived only about two years, but during that time the Scots residents formed a strong bond with the Yamasee-Guale.

In late 1684, armed with Scots firearms, these Indians raided Timucua Province, devastating the mission Santa Catalina de Afuyca. They returned to Stuarts Town with 22 captives, whom they sold as slaves. Over the next two years, word of similar successes of the Stuarts Town-allied Yamasee-Guale carried throughout the region. The population of "Yamasee" Indians near Port Royal Sound grew rapidly. Although the Indians became known collectively as "Yamasee", the Guale continued to be a significant portion of the population.

Spanish forces destroyed Stuarts Town. In the old Guale Province, they strongly resisted counterattacks by South Carolina. Nonetheless, the alliance between the Yamasee and colonial South Carolina grew stronger in reaction. The "Yamasee" who migrated in 1685 to the Port Royal area were rebuilding the old La Tama chiefdom, but they also included numerous Guale, as well as other Indians of mostly Muskogean stock.

The Yamasee lived in South Carolina until they were defeated in the Yamasee War of 1715, after which survivors were widely dispersed and the people disintegrated as a polity. But while they lasted, the Yamasee exhibited multi-ethnic qualities. Their towns were described by European colonists as being Upper Yamasee or Lower Yamasee towns. The Lower Towns were populated mainly by La Tama Indians and included Altamaha (after the chief who lived there), Ocute, and Chechesee (Ichisi).

The Guale were the majority in the Upper Towns, although other ethnicities were incorporated as well. Upper Yamasee Towns with mostly Guale populations likely included Pocotaligo, Pocosabo, and Huspah. Other Upper Towns, such as Tulafina, Sadketche (Salkehatchie), and Tomatley, were probably mixed, with Guale, La Tama, and others. It is possible that the La Tama had spent time in missions and become somewhat Christianized. They may have sought out the similarly missionized Guale.

In 1702, when Carolina Governor James Moore led an invasion into Spanish Florida, his men destroyed the few "refugee missions" in Guale. By 1733, the Guale were so few in number that they showed no resistance to James Oglethorpe's establishment of the Province of Georgia.

A similar missionary province called Mocama (named for a Timucuan chiefdom) was situated just south of Guale, on the coast between the Altamaha River and St. Johns River in Florida.

See also

Santa Catalina de Guale
Spanish missions in Georgia
Spanish missions in Florida

Notes

References

External links
 Guale Village at Seven-Mile Bend historical marker

Muskogean tribes
Colonial United States (Spanish)
Former chiefdoms in North America
Native American tribes in South Carolina
Native American tribes in Georgia (U.S. state)
Pre-statehood history of Georgia (U.S. state)
Pre-statehood history of South Carolina
South Appalachian Mississippian culture
Unattested languages of North America